The Río Colorado Subgroup, formerly named as Río Colorado Formation, is a Late Cretaceous (Santonian to Early Campanian) geologic subgroup of the Neuquén Basin in northern Patagonia, Argentina. It belongs to the Neuquén Group and contains the Anacleto and Bajo de la Carpa Formations. The subgroup overlies the Río Neuquén Subgroup and is overlain by the Allen Formation of the Malargüe Group, separated by an unconformity dated to 79 Ma. Dinosaur remains diagnostic to the genus level are among the fossils that have been recovered from the formation.

Fossil content

Ornithischians

Sauropods 
Titanosaur eggs are known from Neuquén Province.

Theropods

See also 
 List of stratigraphic units with dinosaur body fossils
 List of stratigraphic units with dinosaur trace fossils

References

Bibliography 
 
 

Geologic formations of Argentina
Neuquén Group
Upper Cretaceous Series of South America
Cretaceous Argentina
Campanian Stage
Santonian Stage
Mudstone formations
Sandstone formations
Fossiliferous stratigraphic units of South America
Paleontology in Argentina
Geology of Neuquén Province
Geology of Río Negro Province